The Anyl is a river in Perm Krai and Komi Republic, Russia, a right tributary of Kolva which in turn is a tributary of Vishera. It starts in Komi Republic, near the border with Perm Krai. Main tributaries are the Izkaraush (left) and Payvozh (right).

References 

Rivers of Perm Krai
Rivers of the Komi Republic